Sharm International Hospital in Sharm El Sheikh in Egypt, it serves locals and tourists.

Former president of Egypt Hosni Mubarak was admitted for health problems.

References

Hospitals in Egypt
Sharm El Sheikh